Salida Capital is a Canadian private equity and private wealth management firm, based in Toronto, Ontario, and founded in 2001. The company paid US$1.68 million in 2009 for some of its executives to dine with Warren Buffett, CEO of Berkshire Hathaway. In April 2010, the company announced plans to launch a private equity fund, which at the time had C$100 million in seed investment committed so far. Like many financial portfolios during the financial crisis of 2007–2010, Salida's hedge fund declined in value—it fell 66.5% in 2008—but it recovered a portion the following year by rising 83% (around 40% of its lost value). The firm subsequently suffered further losses, with the Salida Strategic Growth Fund losing a large portion of its capital before deciding to terminate the fund.

References

External links
 salidacapital.com - The last entry on the WayBackMachine was in December 2014.

Companies based in Toronto
Financial services companies established in 2001
Private equity firms of Canada
Hedge fund firms in Canada